Teen Sau Din Ke Baad is a 1938 Hindi social comedy film directed by Sarvottam Badami. This was Badami's first comedy film and it was a success at the box-office; he went on to direct two more comedies after this, Aap Ki Marzi (1939) and Ladies Only (1939), also successes. The film was produced by Sagar Movietone, with story written by Babubhai A. Mehta and dialogue by Wajahat Mirza and Waqif. The music was composed by Anil Biswas with lyrics by Zia Sarhadi. The director of photography was Faredoon Irani and the film starred Bibbo, Motilal, Sabita Devi, Yakub, Pesi Patel and Gulzar.

The film had Motilal playing the role of "a young bored millionaire", who due to his intemperate life-style starts falling ill. He bets with his doctor that he can go out in the world and manage to exist without his wealth.

Plot
Sudhir (Motilal), a young millionaire is leading a dissipated life indulging in drinks, gambling and women due to sheer boredom. His health starts fading and after one such bout he faints. The doctor admonishes him regarding his life-style. He advises him against his fast life and suggests that he take to some physical labour, which the doctor is sure Sudhir will not be able to do. Sudhir takes up the challenge and decides to give up his home for three hundred days and live without using his wealth. He sets out into the world with nothing in his pocket. The challenges he faces and how he overcomes them are interspersed with a lot of humour and hard work as he tries to make a living. He finally ends up working in a soap factory where he falls in love with the typist Sharda (Sabita Devi). The boss Lakshmidas has a wife Ramola (Bibbo), who is attracted to Sudhir. When the boss faces problems with the factory, Sudhir anonymously sends money to help him out. Eventually the three hundred days are over, Sudhir now a healthy young man has won his bet with the doctor and a wife for himself.

Cast
 Sabita Devi as Sharda
 Motilal as Sudhir
 Bibbo
 Yakub
 Sankatha Prasad
 Pesi Patel
 Pande
 Gulzar
 Yusuf
 Waskar
 Rukmini
 Piroj Wadkar

Music
The music was composed by Anil Biswas and had lyrics written by Zia Sarhadi. Songs like "Ghar Apna Yeh Kursi Apni" and "Ik tum Na Hui Toh Kya Hua" became extremely popular. There were nine songs in the film and the singers were Bibbo, Sabita Devi and Motilal.

Song List

References

External links

1938 films
1930s Hindi-language films
Indian black-and-white films
Indian comedy films
1938 comedy films
Films directed by Sarvottam Badami
Hindi-language comedy films